Georgiyevsky District is an administrative district (raion), one of the twenty-six in Stavropol Krai, Russia. It is located in the south of the krai. Its administrative center is the town of Georgiyevsk (which is not administratively a part of the district). Population:  91,371 (2002 Census); 64,965 (1989 Census).

Administrative and municipal status
Within the framework of administrative divisions, Georgiyevsky District is one of the twenty-six in the krai. The town of Georgiyevsk serves as its administrative center, despite being incorporated separately as a town of krai significance—an administrative unit with the status equal to that of the districts.

As a municipal division, the district is incorporated as Georgiyevsky Municipal District. The town of krai significance of Georgiyevsk is incorporated separately from the district as Georgiyevsk Urban Okrug.

References

Notes

Sources

Districts of Stavropol Krai
